Aalo, formerly Along, is a census town and headquarter of the West Siang district district of the Indian state of Arunachal Pradesh.

It is also an Advance Landing Ground (ALG) of Indian Air Force.

Culture
Mopin is the main festival that runs from 5 to 6 April. The Yomgo River Festival, held every year during peak tourist season, and lasting 3–4 days, is celebrated from 05-9 April. This festival is celebrated with a view to promote tourism, indigenous culture, and tradition, handloom & handicrafts and showcase its rich cultural heritage.

Demographics
, Along had a population of 16,834. Males constitute 56% of the population and females 44%. Aalo has an average literacy rate of 69%, higher than the national average of 59.5%; with 75% of the males and 61% of females literate. 15% of the population is under 6 years of age. The low sex ratio – 916 girls for every 1000 boys in 2001 – is cause for concern, even though it is not typical of the region.

The majority of Aalo's(formerly Along) population consists of Galo people and Galo is the main languages but a huge population of Adi consists at Aalo Town. The major religion is Donyi-Polo, followed by Christianity and small minorities of followers of Tibetan Buddhism, Hinduism and Islam.

Languages
 

According to 2011 census, Adi was the most spoken language with 11,199 speakers followed by Hindi at 3,572, Bengali at 1,128, Bhojpuri at 989, Nepali at 956 and Assamese at 781.

Connectivity
Aalo does not have a good road network and the road which runs from north Lakhimpur to the capital city of Itanagar, connects the town of Aalo to the city. Regular bus services to Aalo run from Itanagar. Arunachal Pradesh State Transport Service (APSTS) buses are available to and from Aalo. There is a 5 hours journey by bus from Pasighat to Aalo (106 km) while from Moying (150 km) the bus will take around 6.5 hours to reach Aalo.

The nearest airport to Aalo is at Pasighat. It is connected by flight services to Guwahati, Dibrugarh, Tezpur among others. One can take a bus or hire a taxi from Pasighat to Aalo.

Aalo has no railway and the nearest railway station is at Murkongselek. A new line which connects Aalo to Silapathar through broad gauge railway was proposed and the survey has already been completed and forwarded to the railway board.

Media
Along has an All India Radio Relay station known as Akashvani Along. It broadcasts on FM frequencies.

See also

 Military bases 
 List of ALGs
 List of Indian Air Force stations
 India-China military deployment on LAC
 List of disputed India-China areas
 Tianwendian
 Ukdungle

 Borders
 Line of Actual Control (LAC)
 Borders of China
 Borders of India
 
 Conflicts
 Sino-Indian conflict
 List of disputed territories of China
 List of disputed territories of India

 Other related topics
 India-China Border Roads
 List of extreme points of India
 Defence Institute of High Altitude Research

References

External links
 IAF's ALG
 Air Marshal K. K. Nohwar, Pace of Infrastructure Development in Border Areas: Adequate?, Centre for Air Power Studies, 13 March 2018

Cities and towns in West Siang district